1970s in Ghana details events of note that happened in Ghana in the years 1970 to 1979.

Events
August 1970  - National Liberation commission dissolved.
7 July 1972 - Kwame Nkrumah buried.
October 1975 - the National Redemption Council is reorganized into the Supreme Military Council (SMC).
1977 - SMC faces mounting nonviolent opposition.
March 1978 - national referendum held allow Ghanaians to accept or reject the union government concept.
July 1978 - some SMC officers force I. K. Acheampong to resign, replacing him with Lieutenant General Frederick W.K. Akuffo.
1 January 1979 - ban on party politics lifted.
1979 - constitutional assembly working on a new constitution presents an approved draft to government.
15 May 1979 - a group of junior officers led by Flight Lieutenant Jerry Rawlings attempt a coup.
Coup is unsuccessful, the coup leaders were jailed and held for court-martial.
June 4, sympathetic military officers overthrow the SMC II government led by W. K. Akuffo.
June 1979 - Jerry Rawlings and other junior officers released from prison.
1979 - Rawlings and the young officers form the Armed Forces Revolutionary Council (AFRC).
1979 - executions of former heads of military governments, including leading members of the SMC.
September 1979 - Ghana returns to constitutional rule.
24 September 1979 - Hilla Limann, leader of the People's National Party (PNP), sworn in as president of Ghana.
24 September 1979 - the Third Republic begins.

Deaths
27 April 1972 - Kwame Nkrumah, first president of Ghana, natural causes in Romania (b. 1909).

National holidays
 January 1: New Year's Day
 March 6: Independence Day
 May 1: Labor Day
 December 25: Christmas
 December 26: Boxing day

In addition, several other places observe local holidays, such as the foundation of their town. These are also "special days."

References